, often called lion-dogs in English, are statue pairs of lion-like creatures either guarding the entrance or the honden, or inner shrine of many Japanese Shinto shrines or kept inside the inner shrine itself, where they are not visible to the public. The first type, born during the Edo period, is called , the second and much older type . They can sometimes be found also at Buddhist temples, nobility residences or even private homes.

Symbolic meaning 

Meant to ward off evil spirits, modern komainu statues usually are almost identical, but one has the mouth open, the other closed 
(however, exceptions exist, where both komainu have their mouth either open or closed).

This is a very common characteristic in religious statue pairs at both temples and shrines. The pattern is Buddhist in origin (see the article about the Niō, human-form guardians of Buddhist temples) and has a symbolic meaning: The open mouth is pronouncing the first letter of the Sanskrit alphabet, which is pronounced "a", while the closed one is uttering the last letter, which is pronounced "um", to represent the beginning and the end of all things. Together they form the sound Aum, a syllable sacred in several religions like Hinduism, Buddhism, and Jainism.

History 

Komainu strongly resemble Chinese guardian lions and in fact originate from Tang dynasty China. The Chinese guardian lions are believed to have been influenced by Asiatic lion pelts and lion depictions introduced through trade from either the Middle East or India, countries where the lion existed and was a symbol of strength.
During its transportation along the Silkroad, however, the symbol changed, acquiring a distinctive look. The first lion statue in India appears around the 3rd century BC on top of a column erected by King Ashoka. The tradition later arrived in China where it developed into the guardian lion that was later exported to Korea, Japan, and Okinawa.

During the Nara period (710–794), as in the rest of Asia, the pair always consisted of two lions. Used only indoors until the 14th century, they were made mainly of wood. During the Heian period (794–1185), for example, wooden or metal pairs were employed as weights and door-stops, while at the Imperial Palace they were used to support screens or folding screens.

During the early Heian period (ninth century), the tradition changed and the two statues started to be different and be called differently. One had its mouth open and was called  because, as before, it resembled that animal. The other had its mouth closed, looked rather like a dog, was called komainu, or "Goguryeo dog", and sometimes had a single horn on its head. Gradually the animals returned to be identical, but for their mouths, and ended up being called both komainu.

Ubiquitous as they are now at shrines, Komainu have been used outdoors only since the 14th century. In Asia, the lion was popularly believed to have the power to repel evil, and for this reason it was habitually used to guard gates and doors. In Japan, too it ended up being installed at the entrance of shrines and temples next to the lion-dog. As a protection against exposure to Japan's rainy weather, the komainu started being carved in stone.

The , the stone animals that in Okinawa guard the gates or the roofs of houses, are close relatives of the shishi and the komainu, objects whose origin, function and symbolic meaning they share.

Starting from the Edo period (1603–1868) other animals have been used instead of lions or dogs, among others wild boars, tigers, dragons and foxes.

Foxes at Inari shrines
The most frequent variant of the komainu theme is the fox, guardian of shrines dedicated to kami Inari. There are about 30 thousand Inari shrines in Japan, and the entrance of each is guarded by a pair of fox statues. Often one, and sometimes both, has a sūtra roll, a key or a jewel in its mouth (sūtras are Buddhist texts, a fact which attests to the Buddhist origins of the Inari cult). The statues do not symbolize the animals' proverbial malice, but the magic powers they are believed to possess. Sometimes the guardians are painted, and in that case they are always white. White foxes are messengers of the kami, who is sometimes himself believed to be, and portrayed as, a fox.  Although visible genitals are rare, the left fox is believed to be male, the right one female.

Often the foxes wear red votive bibs similar to those worn by statues of other figures: for example, the Buddhist bodhisattva figure Jizō. In this case, however, the bibs seem to be purely a rite, whose origins are unclear.

Gallery

See also

Chinese guardian lions
Chinthe
Kitsune
Nio
Xiezhi

Notes

References

 

Japanese architectural features
Japanese Buddhist architecture
Buddhist architecture
Mythological dogs
Mythological canines
Mythological lions
Sculptures of lions
Shinto shrines in Japan
Japanese legendary creatures
Objects believed to protect from evil